Joint Staff of the Islamic Revolutionary Guard Corps, formerly called General Staff, was the chief of staff of the Islamic Revolutionary Guard Corps with an aim to coordinate its military branches; and responsible for organization, support, and supervision of all executive affairs within the military. The office was originally created in late 1984 General Provost of IRGC was a subdivision to the Joint Staff.

List of Chiefs

See also 
 General Staff of the Armed Forces of the Islamic Republic of Iran
 Joint Staff of the Islamic Republic of Iran Army

References 

Iran 2
Islamic Revolutionary Guard Corps
Military units and formations established in 1984
Military units and formations disestablished in 2008